The Wizards of AUS represent Australia in men's international roller derby.  First formed in August 2013, the team was originally intended as a warm-up for the Men's Roller Derby World Cup (Birmingham, England 4 to 6 March 2014), in which they competed against the New Zealand Black Skates.

World Cup 2016
On 18 March 2016 the Wizards of AUS named their seventeen-man squad that would be travelling to Calgary in July 2016 to compete in the Men's Roller Derby World Cup. (skaters' league affiliations as of the time of the announcement) 
The Wizards of AUS is in the Blue group and are rostered to play pool games on Thursday 21 July and Friday 22rd.
On the Thursday the Wizards of AUS will play Belgium at 9:00am, Netherlands at 2:00pm, and Puerto Rico 6:00pm. On the Friday they will play France at 3:00pm before moving onto the knockout stage.

Coaching staff
Tui Lyon - Bench Coach 
Crack - Lineup Manager

Captains
Mr Spew 
Sausarge Rolls

MRDWC 2016
The Wizards of AUS started the tournament in Blue Group in which they ranked First and drew Wales national men's roller derby team in the Semifinal.

Playoff game one - Australia 210 def Belgium 31

Playoff game two - Australia 342 def Netherlands 3

Playoff game three - Australia 309 def Puerto Rico 10

Playoff game Four- Australia 79 def France 70

Semifinal - Australia 359 def Wales national men's roller derby team 96

Quarter Final - United States 356 def Australia 89

3rd place playoff - Australia 243 def Canada 174

Australia finished the tournament in 3rd place.

2016 World Cup Warm Up games

On 9 July 2016 the Wizards of AUS had a rematch with the Victorian Roller Derby League All Stars in Victoria (Australia). Victoria defeated the Wizards 199 to 164. The following skaters competed in the public game.

On 2 April 2016 the Wizards of AUS played the Victorian Roller Derby League All Stars in Victoria (Australia). Victoria defeated the Wizards 248 to 181. The following skaters competed in the public game.

2015/16 Training Squad
Try outs for the current team roster were held on 28 February and 7 March 2015, in Melbourne. As of 13 March 2015, the 2015/2016 training team for the Calgary Men's Roller Derby World Cup 2016 is: (skaters' league affiliations as of the time of the announcement)

Coaching staff
Tui Lyon - Bench Coach
Crack - Lineup Manager

Captains
Mr Spew
Sausarge Rolls

World Cup 2014 and Power of Scotland Friendly Roster
On 14 December 2013 the Men's Roller Derby World Cup 2014 was announced. (skaters' league affiliations as of the time of the announcement)

Coaching staff
Annabelle Lecter - Bench Coach
I.V. Anarchy- Lineup Manager

Captains
Flamin' Galah
Mr Spew

MRDWC 2014

The Wizards of AUS started the tournament in Blue Group in which they ranked second and drew England in the Semifinal.

Power of Scotland Friendly 
Australia 422 def Scotland 81

Playoff game one - Australia 232 def Germany 12

Playoff game two - Australia 111 def Ireland 65

Playoff game three - France 117 def Australia 57

Semifinal - England 388 def Australia 138

Quarter Final - Australia 252 def Argentina 238

5th place playoff - Australia 201 def Wales national men's roller derby team 200

Australia finished the tournament in 5th place.

Awards

World Cup Plate - The Wizards of AUS won the Plate Cup and were ranked 5th after the Men's Roller Derby World Cup 2014 
Tournament star Jammer - Sausarge Rolls
Tournament star Blocker - Ass N Junk
Power of Scotland Bout MVP - RPG

New Zealand 2013 Bout Roster
On 8 July 2013 the Roster was announced for the 17 August game against the New Zealand Black Skates in Sydney. (skaters' league affiliations as of the time of the announcement)

Australia 330 New Zealand 122

Coaching staff
Annabelle Lecter - Bench Coach
I.V. Anarchy- Lineup Manager
Under Ceej - Team Manager

Captains
Mr Spew
RAMPAGE

Awards

MANZ Cup - The Wizards of AUS won the Men's Australian and New Zealand Cup 
MVP - WHiPPASNAPPA
Best Jammer - Hellton
Best Blocker - RAMPAGE
Most Feared - Kernel Panic

References

Men's national team
National roller derby teams
2013 establishments in Australia
National sports teams established in 2013
Men's national sports teams of Australia